Kennet and Lambourn Floodplain is a  biological Site of Special Scientific Interest in six widely separated areas in the floodplains of the River Lambourn in Berkshire and the River Kennet in Wiltshire, England. It is a Nature Conservation Review site and part of the Kennet and Lambourn Floodplain Special Area of Conservation. One of the areas, Rack Marsh, is managed by the Berkshire, Buckinghamshire and Oxfordshire Wildlife Trust.

These six areas all have fen or swamp with large numbers of Desmoulin's whorl snail, which is listed in the British Red Data Book as it is a nationally rare and declining species. One of the areas, Eddington Marsh, also has unimproved species-rich grassland with several nationally scarce invertebrates, such as the flies Pherbellia griseola, Psacadina verbekei, Platypalpus  niger and ''Oxycera  morrisi.

Locations

 
 
 
 
 
 

Location   is shown as a seventh area in the citation, but the citation also says that there are only six areas in the site and it is not shown on the Natural England map.

References

 

Kennet and Avon Canal
Sites of Special Scientific Interest in Berkshire
Sites of Special Scientific Interest in Wiltshire
Special Areas of Conservation in England
Floodplains of Europe
Nature Conservation Review sites